Sonny Bono Memorial Park is a park in Northwest Washington, D.C., at the intersection of New Hampshire Avenue, 20th Street, and O Street near Dupont Circle. It is named for Sonny Bono. The park was established in 1998, after Sonny Bono's death, by Bono family friend Geary Simon, a local real estate developer. He approached the D.C. Department of Parks and Recreation's Park Partners program and paid $25,000 of his own money to revitalize an unused  triangle of grass on a traffic island. His improvements included installing an underground sprinkler system, planting new Kentucky bluegrass and a Japanese maple, as well as benches and a wrought-iron fence. The park also features a vault of Sonny Bono memorabilia, such as the sheet music for "The Beat Goes On," his official Congressional cufflinks, and a mug from his string of Bono's Restaurants.

At the entrance, on the ground, is a plaque that reads as follows:

IN MEMORY OF MY FRIEND SONNY BONO 1935-1998; ENTERTAINER - ENTREPRENEUR - STATESMAN - FRIEND.

External links

Article at The Washington Post
2005 article from Washington Monthly

1998 establishments in Washington, D.C.
Dupont Circle
Monuments and memorials in Washington, D.C.
Parks established in 1998
Parks in Washington, D.C.
Sonny Bono